Brandenbourg is a village in the commune of Tandel, in north-eastern Luxembourg.  It lies in the valley of the Blees river, and is the site of the 10th century Brandenbourg Castle.  , the village had a population of 189.

Until 1 January 2006, Brandenbourg was part of the commune of Bastendorf, which was merged with the commune of Fouhren to form the modern commune of Tandel.

Tandel
Villages in Luxembourg